Utsurgae was a settlement and station (mutatio) of ancient Thrace, inhabited during Byzantine times. 

Its site is located near Çakıllı in European Turkey.

References

Populated places in ancient Thrace
Former populated places in Turkey
Roman towns and cities in Turkey
Populated places of the Byzantine Empire
History of Kırklareli Province